Adrian Mung'andu (c. 1923 – 25 June 2007) was the Catholic archbishop of Lusaka between 1984 and 1996.

Mung'andu was born in Kasisi, Chongwe District around 1923 and went to primary school there. He went to secondary school in Chikuni where he also studied to be a teacher. In 1943, he went to the seminary at Chishawasha in Zimbabwe being ordained as a priest in 1950.

During the 1950s and early 1960s, Mung'andu worked as a parish priest and as a principal of the Kasisi Boys School. He was made Vicar-General of Lusaka in 1963 before being moved to a parish in Livingstone in 1969. Pope Paul VI appointed him as Bishop of Livingstone in 1975 before Pope John Paul II promoted him in 1984.

References

1920s births
2007 deaths
Zambian Roman Catholic archbishops
20th-century Roman Catholic archbishops in Africa
People from Chongwe District
Roman Catholic bishops of Livingstone
Roman Catholic archbishops of Lusaka
Zambian expatriates in Zimbabwe